State Route 93 (SR 93) is an  state highway  in Pike County, Alabama,  United States, that serves as a connection between the towns of Brundidge and Banks .

Route description

SR 93 begins at an intersection with U.S. Route 231 (US 231) to the south of downtown Brundidge. From this point, the highway travels in a northerly direction before reaching its northern terminus at US 29 in Banks.

Major intersections

See also

References

External links

093
Transportation in Pike County, Alabama